Dan Farthing (born November 10, 1969) is a former Canadian Football League wide receiver who played eleven seasons for the Saskatchewan Roughriders from 1991 through 2001.

References

1969 births
Living people
Canadian football wide receivers
Players of Canadian football from Saskatchewan
Saskatchewan Roughriders players
Saskatchewan Huskies football players
Sportspeople from Saskatoon
Saskatchewan Roughriders coaches